Hans Känel (born 3 May 1953) is a Swiss former professional racing cyclist. He rode in the 1982 Tour de France. He also competed in the team pursuit event at the 1980 Summer Olympics.

References

External links

1953 births
Living people
Swiss male cyclists
Cyclists from Bern
Olympic cyclists of Switzerland
Cyclists at the 1980 Summer Olympics